The Voice of the Violin  (Italian: La voce del violino) is a 1997 novel by Andrea Camilleri, translated into English in 2003 by Stephen Sartarelli. 

It is the fourth novel of the internationally popular Inspector Montalbano series.

Plot introduction
It is one of those black days that afflict Montalbano, who becomes intractable when the weather is bad. On his way to a funeral, Montalbano's driver avoids what seems to be a suicidal chicken, making the car skid and hitting another car parked in front of a villa. The inspector leaves a note under the windshield wiper of the damaged car to warn the owner. Since his colleague complains about the blow he received, the two go to the hospital. On the way back - it has now become too late for the funeral ceremony - the inspector notices that the damaged car has remained where he left it with the ticket still in the windshield wiper.

Finding the damaged car still where it was the next morning, Montalbano forces the door of the villa which has signs of being inhabited but appears deserted. He wanders through the various rooms until in a bedroom a gruesome scene appears in the eyes of the inspector: a young woman, blonde and beautiful, completely naked, lies dead in her bed.

Characters
 Salvo Montalbano, Vigàta's chief police station 
 Domenico "Mimì" Augello, Montalbano's deputy and close friend 
 Giuseppe Fazio, Montalbano's right-hand man 
 Agatino Catarella, police officer 
 Livia Burlando, Montalbano's eternal girlfriend 
 Dr. Pasquano, Vigàta's local forensic pathologist
 Michela Licalzi, the dead woman 
 Commissioner Luca Bonetti-Alderighi, Montalbano's new superior 
 Maurizio Di Blasi, Michela's young secret lover
 Anna, Michela's attractive friend

Reception
Maxine Clark described the novel as "a perfect example of all that is good about this series. The plot is one of the stronger, leaner ones".

Adaptation
It was first adapted for television by RAI with Luca Zingaretti in the TV series Inspector Montalbano. The episode was the second of the series and aired on 13 May 1999.

References

1997 novels
Inspector Montalbano novels
Italian crime novels
Italian mystery novels
Novels set in Sicily
Picador (imprint) books
20th-century Italian novels